Hidrosmin is a flavone, a type of flavonoid. It is a vasoprotective.

Flavone glycosides
Phenol ethers